Cristina Pérez (born 30 October 1965) is a Spanish sprinter.

Perez competed in the women's 4 × 400 metres relay at the 1992 Summer Olympics. Perez held the Spanish national record for 400 metres hurdles for 33 years, until her time of 55.23 was lowered by Sara Gallego, in 2021.

References

External links
 

1965 births
Living people
Athletes (track and field) at the 1988 Summer Olympics
Athletes (track and field) at the 1992 Summer Olympics
Spanish female sprinters
Spanish female hurdlers
Olympic athletes of Spain
Place of birth missing (living people)